Trevor Barron (born September 30, 1992) is an American race walker who competed at the 2012 Summer Olympics in London, finishing 26th in the 20 km race walk, the best American finish in history for the event. He attended Colorado College in Colorado Springs, Colorado.

Major competition record

References

External links

 
 USATF profile for Trevor Barron

1992 births
Living people
American male racewalkers
Olympic track and field athletes of the United States
Athletes (track and field) at the 2012 Summer Olympics
USA Outdoor Track and Field Championships winners
USA Indoor Track and Field Championships winners